These are the official results of the Men's high jump event at the 1986 European Championships in Stuttgart, West Germany, held at Neckarstadion on 30 and 31 August 1986.

Medalists

Results

Qualification
30 August

Final
31 August

Participation
According to an unofficial count, 17 athletes from 11 countries participated in the event.

 (1)
 (1)
 (1)
 (1)
 (1)
 (3)
 (3)
 (1)
 (1)
 (1)
 (3)

See also
 1982 Men's European Championships High Jump (Athens)
 1983 Men's World Championships High Jump (Helsinki)
 1984 Men's Olympic High Jump (Los Angeles)
 1987 Men's World Championships High Jump (Rome)
 1988 Men's Olympic High Jump (Seoul)
 1990 Men's European Championships High Jump (Split)

References

 Results

High jump
High jump at the European Athletics Championships